The Bluebird Building, also known as the Higgins Block, at 220-224 N. Higgins Ave. in Missoula, Montana, was built in 1889 at cost of $125,000 and was modified later.  It was listed on the National Register of Historic Places in 1996.

It included the Empress Theater.

References

		
National Register of Historic Places in Missoula, Montana
Early Commercial architecture in the United States
Commercial buildings completed in 1889
1889 establishments in Montana